Robert Brook Aspland (19 January 1805 – 21 June 1869) was an English Unitarian minister and editor. To be distinguished from his father Robert Aspland (1782-1845).

Life
The son of Robert Aspland, he was born at Newport, Isle of Wight, 19 January 1805. He was educated first with Mr. Potticary of Blackheath (where Benjamin Disraeli was his schoolfellow), next with Mr. Evans of Tavistock, then at Glasgow University, where he graduated as M.A. in 1822. Lastly he went to Manchester College, York, finishing his studies in 1826.

Crook's Lane, Chester, was his first chapel, whither he went in August 1826. He left in 1833 to be co-pastor with Lant Carpenter at Lewin's Mead chapel, Bristol, where, on 21 October of that year, he married Jane Hibbert, and established a boarding-school. In 1836 he moved to Dukinfield; in 1858 to Hackney. He took up the editorship of the Christian Reformer on his father's death in 1845, keeping it till the publication ceased in 1863. In 1846 he was made one of the secretaries of Manchester College (holding the post till 1857).

Brook Aspland became secretary to the British and Foreign Unitarian Association in 1859; he was helped by a colleague in 1867, and having fallen into bad health, he died suddenly 21 June 1869, aged 65.

Works

In 1850 he collected from the Christian Reformer memoirs of his father's life. Some other publications were: A Brief Memoir of the Rev. Paul Cardale, extracted from the Christian Reformer, 1852; sermons, and Paul Best, the Unitarian Confessor, 1853; and Mr. Richard Frankland and Dr. Henry Sampson, reprinted in pamphlet form, 1862.

Attribution

1805 births
1869 deaths
English Unitarian ministers
People from Newport, Isle of Wight
Alumni of the University of Glasgow
English magazine editors
19th-century Unitarian clergy
19th-century English people
19th-century British journalists
British male journalists
19th-century British male writers
19th-century British writers
Alumni of Harris Manchester College, Oxford